"Like I Do" is a song by French record producer David Guetta and Dutch music producers Martin Garrix and Brooks. Written by Talay Riley, Sean Douglas, Nick Seeley, Robert Bergin and its producers Guetta, Garrix, Brooks and Giorgio Tuinfort, it was released on 22 February 2018 by What a Music, as the second single from Guetta's seventh studio album, 7 (2018).

Background
Guetta said of the song: "When we hit the studio we were already working on several tracks. After we saw the great response on 'So Far Away' we thought f*** it, we will release another track together straight away." Garrix added: "David is a legend. I have a lot of respect for him as an artist and I'm very happy we were able to release another track together with the amazing Brooks who I have worked with on other records before. I think he's one of the most talented producers out there."

Release and promotion
Garrix originally premiered the song during his TimeOut72 Festival set in Goa, India. On 14 February 2018, Guetta and Brooks released a teaser of the song on social media, revealing its release date. A remix contest for the song was held in association with the app Soonvibes, winners were selected as part of the official remixes.

Composition
"Like I Do" is a big room house and EDM track, with vocals provided by Talay Riley. It blends elements from future bounce and pop with "heavy bass and a dancefloor-ready beat". On the opening lines, the voice rises "over shimmering synths and a fizzing production", before building up into "an earworm-worthy chorus". According to Billboards Kat Bein, the song is "a stomping mix of horns and bass that's funky".

Critical reception
In a positive review, a Your EDM contributor regarded the song as "a wonderfully melodic new release that's a surefire radio hit with an EDM-friendly drop that Garrix and Brooks fans will both appreciate". Mike Nied of Idolator called the collaboration "refreshing", deeming the song "a blending of all their respective sounds".

Track listing
 Digital download
 "Like I Do" – 3:22

 Digital download – remixes
 "Like I Do" (Dasko & Agrero remix) – 2:58
 "Like I Do" (Upsilone remix) – 2:50
 "Like I Do" (Jumpexx remix) – 4:07
 "Like I Do" (Foxa and Conor Ross remix) – 3:43
 "Like I Do" (Edson Faiolli remix) – 5:10

Credits and personnel
Credits adapted from Tidal.
 David Guetta – composition, production, programming
 Martin Garrix – composition, production, programming
 Brooks – composition, production, master engineering, mixing, programming
 Talay Riley – composition, background vocals
 Giorgio Tuinfort – composition, production, programming
 Sean Douglas – composition
 Nick Seeley – composition, keyboard
 Robert Bergin – composition
 The Pianoman – talk box

Charts

Weekly charts

Year-end charts

Certifications

Release history

References

External links
 

2018 songs
2018 singles
David Guetta songs
Martin Garrix songs
Songs written by David Guetta
Songs written by Martin Garrix
Songs written by Talay Riley
Songs written by Giorgio Tuinfort
Songs written by Sean Douglas (songwriter)
Stmpd Rcrds singles
Song recordings produced by David Guetta